The 2000 Embassy World Professional Darts Championship was held at the Lakeside Country Club, Frimley Green, Surrey between 8–16 January 2000.

Ted Hankey was in imperious form throughout the tournament, reaching the quarter-finals without dropping a set and battling back from 4-2 down in the semi-finals against Chris Mason - who had earlier thwarted Raymond van Barneveld's ambitions of three consecutive BDO World titles - to win 5-4. He then took just 46 minutes to beat Ronnie Baxter 6-0 in the final - finishing off with a maximum 170 checkout.

Hankey also hit a record 48 180s in the tournament, including 22 against Mason.

Seeds
  Raymond van Barneveld
  Ronnie Baxter
  Mervyn King
  Robbie Widdows
  Ted Hankey
  Martin Adams
  Les Wallace
  Peter Johnstone

Prize money
The prize money was £175,000.

Champion: £44,000
Runner-Up: £22,000
Semi-Finalists (2): £9,700
Quarter-Finalists (4): £4,900
Last 16 (8): £3,750
Last 32 (16): £2,500

There was also a 9 Dart Checkout prize of £52,000, along with a High Checkout prize of £2,000.

The Results

References

BDO World Darts Championships
BDO World Darts Championships
BDO World Darts Championships
BDO World Darts Championships
Sport in Surrey
Frimley Green